Arne Grahn (22 January 1902 – 21 November 1989) was a Finnish tennis player. He competed in the men's singles and doubles events at the 1924 Summer Olympics. He won more than 40 Finnish championships between 1920 and 1947.

References

External links
 

1902 births
1989 deaths
Finnish male tennis players
Olympic tennis players of Finland
Tennis players at the 1924 Summer Olympics
Sportspeople from Helsinki
20th-century Finnish people